The Roman Catholic Diocese of Bunda is a diocese located in Bunda Town in the Ecclesiastical province of Mwanza in Tanzania.

History
 November 27, 2010: Established as Diocese of Bunda from the Archdiocese of Mwanza and the Diocese of Musoma.

Territory
The diocese comprises the districts of Bunda and Ukerewe and two parishes from the district of Musoma.

Cathedral
The Parish church of St. Paul's in Bunda is the cathedral church of the diocese.

Leadership
 Bishop Renatus Leonard Nkwande (2010.11.27 – 2019.02.11), appointed Archbishop of Mwanza
 Bishop Simon Chibuga Masondole (2021.04.06 – ...)

See also
Roman Catholicism in Tanzania

Sources
 GCatholic.org
 Catholic Hierarchy

Mara Region
Roman Catholic dioceses in Tanzania
Christian organizations established in 2010
2010 establishments in Tanzania
 
Dioceses of the Roman Catholic Ecclesiastical Province of Mwanza